The 2023 Rochdale Metropolitan Borough Council elections are scheduled to take place on 4 May 2023 alongside other local elections across the United Kingdom. One third of seats (20) on Rochdale Metropolitan Borough Council are to be contested.

Background 
The Local Government Act 1972 created a two-tier system of metropolitan counties and districts covering Greater Manchester, Merseyside, South Yorkshire, Tyne and Wear, the West Midlands, and West Yorkshire starting in 1974. Rochdale was a district of the Greater Manchester metropolitan county. The Local Government Act 1985 abolished the metropolitan counties, with metropolitan districts taking on most of their powers as metropolitan boroughs. The Greater Manchester Combined Authority was created in 2011 and began electing the mayor of Greater Manchester from 2017, which was given strategic powers covering a region coterminous with the former Greater Manchester metropolitan county.

Since its formation, Rochdale has variously been under Labour control, Liberal Democrat control, Conservative control and no overall control. Councillors have predominantly been elected from the Labour Party, Liberal Democrats and the Conservative Party, with some independent councillors also serving.  The council has had an overall Labour majority since the 2011.

In the most recent election in 2022, where all 60 seats on the council were up for election, Labour won 42 seats with 50% of the vote, the Conservatives won ten seats with 20% of the vote, the Middleton Independents Party won five seats with 9% of the vote and the Liberal Democrats won three seats with 17% of the vote.

Electoral process 
The council generally elects its councillors in thirds, with a third being up for election every year for three years, with no election in the fourth year. The election will be conducted using the first-past-the-post voting system, with each ward electing one councillor.

All registered electors (British, Irish, Commonwealth and European Union citizens) living in Rochdale aged 18 or over were entitled to vote in the election. People who lived at two addresses in different councils, such as university students with different term-time and holiday addresses, were entitled to be registered for and vote in elections in both local authorities. Voting in-person at polling stations took place from 07:00 to 22:00 on election day, and voters were able to apply for postal votes or proxy votes in advance of the election.

Candidates 

Asterisks denote incumbent councillors seeking re-election.

Balderstone & Kirkholt

Bamford

Castleton

Central Rochdale

East Middleton

Healey

Hopwood Hall

Kingsway

Littleborough Lakeside

Milkstone & Deeplish

Milnrow & Newhey

Norden

North Heywood

North Middleton

Smallbridge & Firgrove

South Middleton

Spotland & Falinge

Wardle, Shore & West Littleborough

West Heywood

West Middleton

References 

Rochdale Council elections
Rochdale